Baggett is a surname. Notable people with the surname include:
Al Baggett (fl. 1933–39), American college football coach
Alley Baggett (born 1973), American glamour model
Bill Baggett (1902–1978), English footballer
Billy Baggett (born 1929), American professional football player
Charlie Baggett (born 1953), American football coach
Julius H. Baggett (born 1925), American politician 
Kevin Baggett (born 1966), American basketball coach
Lee Baggett Jr. (1927–1999), American admiral
Owen J. Baggett (1920–2006), American Army Air Force pilot during WWII
Samantha Baggett (born 1976), American soccer player